Acropeltates is a genus of flies in the family Stratiomyidae.

Species
Acropeltates diversicornis Kertész, 1923
Acropeltates fasciata Kertész, 1923
Acropeltates kerteszi Szilády, 1929

References

Stratiomyidae
Brachycera genera
Taxa named by Kálmán Kertész
Diptera of South America